Headquarters Regiment (HQ REGT) was a logistics regiment based at Marine Corps Base Camp Lejeune, North Carolina and falls under the command of the 2nd Marine Logistics Group (2nd MLG) and the II Marine Expeditionary Force (II MEF), United States Marine Corps. Headquarters Regiment was redesignated as Combat Logistics Regiment 27 (CLR 27).

Mission
Provide combat logistics to 2d Marine Expeditionary Brigade (MEB) and command, control and coordination of logistics services to II MEF forces. Execute Maritime Pre-positioning Force (MPF) operations in order to achieve rapid build-up of combat power. Provide combat logistics to Marine Expeditionary Units and provide terminal operation support to deploying II MEF forces.

Subordinate units
 Combat Logistics Battalion 22
 Combat Logistics Battalion 24
 Combat Logistics Battalion 26

See also

 List of United States Marine Corps regiments
 Organization of the United States Marine Corps

References
Notes

Web

 HQREGT's official website 

Combat logistics regiments of the United States Marine Corps